St Stephen's, Twickenham, is a Church of England church on Richmond Road in  East Twickenham in the London Borough of Richmond upon Thames. Its vicar is Jez Barnes.

The congregation dates from 1720 when a chapel was founded on what was to become Montpelier Road.

The building, which dates from 1874 and is Grade II listed,  was designed by T. M. Lockwood and T. H. Mawson. The chancel was added in 1885 and the tower in 1907. Most of the stained glass windows are by Alfred Octavius Hemming (1843–1907). The organ, installed in 1889, is one of the best preserved Henry Willis & Sons organs in London.

Services are held on Sunday mornings at 9.00 am, 10.30 am and 6.00 pm.

St. Stephen's School, Twickenham, a mixed, state-run, Church of England primary school on Winchester Road, is affiliated with St Stephen's Church and regularly holds events there.

References

External links
Official website

1720 establishments in England
19th-century Church of England church buildings
Churches completed in 1907
Churches in Twickenham
Twickenham
Diocese of London
Grade II listed churches in the London Borough of Richmond upon Thames